The 2022–23 Bowling Green Falcons men's basketball team represented Bowling Green State University in the 2022–23 NCAA Division I men's basketball season. The Falcons, led by first year head coach Todd Simon, play their home games at the Stroh Center in Bowling Green, Ohio as members of the Mid-American Conference.  The Falcons were previously coached by Michael Huger, however, after an 11–20 season and a 5–13 MAC record the falcons finished tied for ninth in the MAC and failed to qualify for the MAC tournament. Huger was fired after the season on March 5.

Previous season

The Falcons finished the season 13–18, 6–14 in MAC play to finish in ninth place. They failed to qualify for the MAC tournament.

Offseason

Departures

Incoming transfers

Recruiting class

Roster

Schedule and results

|-
!colspan=9 style=|Exhibition

|-
!colspan=9 style=|Non-conference regular season

|-
!colspan=9 style=| MAC regular season

Source

References

Bowling Green Falcons men's basketball seasons
Bowling Green
Bowling Green Falcons men's basketball
Bowling Green Falcons men's basketball